Bruno Joseph Niedziela (April 12, 1923 – March 22, 1962) was an American football tackle who played one season in the All-America Football Conference (AAFC) for the Chicago Rockets. He played college football for Iowa.

Niedziela was born on April 12, 1923, in Chicago, Illinois. He attended Crane High School there, and was a champion wrestler. He graduated in c. 1942, and subsequently played college football for University of Iowa. He won a major letter that year, and started five out of ten games.

He was drafted to serve in World War II during 1943, and was a member of the United States Marine Corps from 1943 to 1945.

He returned to University of Iowa in 1946, and was starting right tackle. He left the school in 1947, signing a professional football contract with the Chicago Rockets of the All-America Football Conference (AAFC). Overall, in the 1947 AAFC season, Niedziela appeared in twelve games, and was a starter in nine of them. He left the team in 1948.

Niedziela later owned a tavern near Richmond, Illinois. He committed suicide on March 22, 1962, at the age of 38.

Notes

References

1923 births
1962 deaths
Players of American football from Chicago
American football tackles
Iowa Hawkeyes football players
Chicago Rockets players
1962 suicides
Suicides by firearm in Illinois
United States Marine Corps personnel of World War II